Liwaa al-Umma ( Liwāʼ al-Ummah, meaning "Banner of the Nation") was a Salafi jihadist group fighting against the Syrian government in the Syrian Civil War. The group was founded by Mahdi Al-Harati, an Irish-Libyan who led the Libyan rebel Tripoli Brigade during the Battle of Tripoli. Harati stepped down as the group's leader after six months, leaving Syrians in charge. In September 2012, it aligned itself with the Free Syrian Army.

By January 2014, Liwaa al-Umma had joined with other rebel groups in Hama Governorate, including Liwa al-Haqq and Jund al-Aqsa, into a Salafi jihadist coalition called the Muhajirin wa-Ansar Alliance (not to be confused with the Chechen-led Jaish al-Muhajireen wal-Ansar).

Structure and membership
Harati decided to form the group following discussions with supporters of the Syrian opposition during a fact-finding mission to Syria in early 2012.

According to Harati, about 90% of its 6,000+ members are Syrians, with the remaining 10% a mixture of Libyans, Egyptians, Palestinians, Sudanese and other Arabs. Harati also says that most of the Syrian fighters are former members of other rebel groups who decided to join Liwaa al-Umma, whilst others have joined as individuals. He also says that most of the Libyans are former members of the Tripoli Brigade, which received training from Qatari Special Forces in the town of Nalut during the Libyan Civil War. Syrians in Liwaa al-Umma say that, compared to most other rebel groups in Syria, the group is seen as better organized and more disciplined.

Although allegedly most of its members are Syrian, foreign volunteers play a key role in the leadership of the group. The main alleged reason behind the formation of the group was so that Al-Harati and other foreign volunteers could share with the Syrian opposition their expertise and experiences fighting elsewhere.

Liwaa al-Umma and the Free Syrian Army were separate until around September 2012.

The group also reportedly has plans to set up a political wing to represent it in post-war Syria.

Ideology
According to Thomas Pierret, a lecturer in contemporary Syrian Islam at the University of Edinburgh, "He (Al-Harati) is not a jihadi; he sees himself as a Libyan revolutionary there to help the Syrian revolution". Members of the group have described the Syrian Civil War as a "people's revolution" and not an "al-Qaeda jihad".

Radwan Mortada, from Al Akhbar newspaper, described the group as "jihadist" but not as extreme as other groups like the al-Nusra Front. According to the newspaper, the group holds that every Muslim has a religious obligation to free Syrians from "the tyrant" and establish "right-guided Islamic rule" in the country. It also says that Liwaa al-Umma follows "Islamic rules of warfare", which includes not targeting non-combatants, carrying out reprisals against innocents, or harming property or possessions.

The group's alleged Facebook page lists goals such as defending the ummah and liberating it from dictatorship and aggression; co-operating to establish Islamic governance, and working to unite the ummah and bring about its "renaissance". Mohammed al-Sukni, Liwaa al-Umma's commander in Homs, said "I would like to see Syria with a moderate Islamic government – something like Tunisia or Turkey". Abdelmajid al-Khatib, the group's political organizer, said that Liwaa al-Umma plan to transform into a political party once the Assad government is overthrown. He said "we envisage a party that will accept all factions, religions, and sects in Syria, including Alawites, but with an Islamic frame of reference" and added, "we want to be part of any transitional government".

Funding
Liwaa al-Umma is well-funded compared to other Syrian rebel groups, with most of its uniforms and weapons having been bought in Turkey. Harati has claimed that the group's funds come from a network of private donors from throughout Syria, the Middle East, and North Africa, with several named benefactors from Kuwait receiving particular praise on the group's Facebook page.

See also
 Tripoli Brigade
List of armed groups in the Syrian Civil War

References

External links
  

Anti-government factions of the Syrian civil war
Jihadist groups in Syria
Military units and formations established in 2012